Pseudophoxinus maeandricus is a species of fish in the carp family, Cyprinidae. It is endemic to Turkey, where it is known only from an area near Sandıklı. It is also known as the  Sandıklı spring minnow or Menderes brook minnow.

This fish reaches up to about 7.9 centimeters in length. It lives in streams and marshes with thick vegetation. It is considered to be a critically endangered species due to habitat loss.

References

Pseudophoxinus
Endemic fauna of Turkey
Fish described in 1960
Taxonomy articles created by Polbot